Yury Dudarev (born 13 February 1970) is a Soviet ski jumper. He competed in the normal hill and large hill events at the 1992 Winter Olympics.

References

1970 births
Living people
Soviet male ski jumpers
Olympic ski jumpers of the Unified Team
Ski jumpers at the 1992 Winter Olympics
Place of birth missing (living people)